Maslaha or maslahah is a concept in shari'ah (Islamic divine law) regarded as a basis of law. It forms a part of extended methodological principles of Islamic jurisprudence (uṣūl al-fiqh) and denotes prohibition or permission of something, according to necessity and particular circumstances, on the basis of whether it serves the public interest of the Muslim community (ummah). In principle, maslaha is invoked particularly for issues that are not regulated by the Qur'an, the sunnah (the teachings and practices of the Islamic prophet Muhammad), or qiyas (analogy). The concept is acknowledged and employed to varying degrees depending on the jurists and schools of Islamic jurisprudence (maddhab). The application of the concept has become more important in modern times because of its increasing relevance to contemporary legal issues.

Overview
The concept was first clearly articulated by al-Ghazali (d. 1111), who argued that maslaha was Allah's general purpose in revealing the divine law, and that its specific aims was preservation of five essentials of human well-being: religion, life, intellect, offspring, and property. Although most classical-era jurists recognized maslaha as an important legal principle, they held different views regarding the role that it should play in Islamic law. Some jurists viewed it as auxiliary rationale constrained by scriptural sources and analogical reasoning. Others regarded the concept as an independent source of law, whose general principles could override specific inferences based on the letter of scripture. The latter view was held by a minority of classical jurists, but in modern times, it came to be championed in different forms by prominent scholars who sought to adapt Islamic law to changing social conditions by drawing on the intellectual heritage of traditional jurisprudence. Along with the analogous concept of maqasid, it has come to play an increasingly prominent role in modern time because of the need to confront legal issues that were unknown in the past.

There are several other equivalent or analogous concepts in Uṣūl al-fiqh, some of each associated with respective maddhabs. The concept of maqasid (aim or purpose) is comparable in a sense that connotes both the ultimate objective and the goal of the application of the shari'ah. The concept of istislah is a related subject, which is employed by Imam Ahmad ibn Hanbal. The meaning of maslaha is "public interest", and the meaning of istislah is "to seek the best public interest", the Sharia's object and purpose. The concept of istihsan means equitable preference for finding solutions to the legal issues. The term is used by the Hanafi school of law, and according to the understanding, the results of qiyas can be overridden when it is considered harmful or undesirable. The term was also used by the Hanbali scholar Ibn Qudamah and by the Maliki jurist Averroes. The Shafi'i school does not recognize the application of maslaha, as it may open the door to the unrestricted use based on fallible human opinions, but it has a corresponding concept, istidlal, which is induced when necessary to avoid the strict application of qiyas.

Usage
Maslaha was used in one sense by the Andalusian lawyer al-Shatibi (d. 1388), who focused on the motivations behind the Islamic law. Regarding questions related to God, 'ibadat, humans should look to the Qur'an or the Sunnah for answers, but regarding the relationship between humans, mu'amalat, humans should look for the best public solution. Since societies change, al-Shatibi thought that the mu'amalat part of the Islamic law also needed to change.

Maslaha has also been used by several Muslim reformers in recent centuries. Ibn Abd al-Wahhab (d. 1792) used maslaha in a few cases. The concept is more known to Islamic modernists. Among them, Muhammad Abduh is especially recognized for using the concept of maslaha as the basis for reconciling modern cultural values with the traditional moral code of Islamic law in the late 19th century. The Muslim Brotherhood, an Islamic fundamentalist group, also invokes maslaha to explain their commitment to public welfare.

External links 
 Maṣlaḥa in Contemporary Islamic Legal Theory - JSTOR

See also 
 Common good
 Mutaween
 Sharia
 Najm ad-Din Al-Tufi
Maslany

References

Arabic words and phrases in Sharia
Islamic terminology
Sharia legal terminology
Islamic jurisprudence